This is a list of islands in the Atlantic Ocean, the largest of which is Greenland. Note that the definition of the ocean used by the International Hydrographic Organization (IHO) excludes the seas, gulfs, bays, etc., bordering the ocean itself. Thus, for instance, not all of the islands of the United Kingdom are actually in or bordering on the Atlantic. For reference, islands in gulfs and seas are included in a separate section. Oceanic islands are formed by seamounts rising from the ocean floor with peaks above the surface of the ocean and are not parts of continental tectonic plates.

List by subregion

North Atlantic Ocean

East
Azores (Portugal)
São Miguel, Santa Maria, Terceira, Graciosa, São Jorge, Pico, Faial Island, Flores, Corvo
Berlengas (Portugal)
Bissagos Islands (Guinea-Bissau)
Canary Islands (Spain)
Lanzarote, Fuerteventura, Gran Canaria, Tenerife, La Gomera, La Palma, El Hierro, La Graciosa
Cape Verde Islands
Boa Vista, Brava, Fogo, Maio, Santo Antão, São Vicente, Santa Luzia, São Nicolau, Sal, Santiago
British territories:
Great Britain
Anglesey (Wales, United Kingdom)
Isle of Man  (British Crown Dependency)
Hebrides (Scotland, United Kingdom)
Orkney (Scotland, United Kingdom)
Shetland (Scotland, United Kingdom)
Isles of Scilly (England, United Kingdom)
Isle of Wight (England, United Kingdom)

Ireland
Some of the minor islands of Ireland
Madeira (Portugal)
Madeira Island, Porto Santo, Desertas, Selvagens
Rockall (disputed by the United Kingdom, Norway and Ireland)
Savage Islands (Portugal)
São Tomé and Príncipe

North
Faroe Islands (Denmark)
Borðoy, Eysturoy, Fugloy, Hestur, Kalsoy, Koltur, Kunoy, Lítla Dímun, Mykines, Nólsoy, Sandoy, Skúvoy, Stóra Dímun, Streymoy, Suðuroy, Svínoy, Vágar, Viðoy
Greenland (Denmark)
Appat Island, Akilia, Alluttoq, Ammassalik, Anoraliuirsoq, Apusiaajik Island, Bjonesk, Clavering, Disko (Qeqertarsuaq), Egger, Eila, Hazenland, Skjoldungen, Hendrik, Herbert, Ikeq, Illorsuit Island, Ile de France, Inussullissuaq, John Murray, Kiatassuaq, Kuhn, Kulusuk, Lindhands, Lynns, Qeqertarsuatsiaq, Salleq Island, Salliaruseq Island, Simiutaq, Talerua, Uummannaq Island, Warming Island
Iceland
Inhabited islands: Vestmannaeyjar, Hrísey, Grímsey, Flatey. See also list here minor islands of Iceland
Baffin Island (Canada)

West
Trinidad and Tobago
Antigua and Barbuda one side borders the Atlantic
Guadeloupe
Dominica
The Bahamas
Barbados
Bermuda (United Kingdom)
Newfoundland (Canada)
Baccalieu Island, Bell Island, Fogo Island, Funk Island, Kelly's Island, Random Island
Oak Island (Canada)
Sable Island (Canada)
Coastal islands of the United States (north to south)
Matinicus Island, Monhegan Island, Mount Desert Island, Isles of Shoals, Boston Harbor Islands, Prudence Island, Conanicut Island, Aquidneck Island, Elizabeth Islands, Martha's Vineyard, Nantucket Island, Fishers Island, Block Island, Long Island, Fire Island, Manhattan, Roosevelt Island, Staten Island, Barnegat Bay Island, Long Beach Island, Bonnet Island, Brigantine Island, Absecon Island, Peck's Beach Island, Ludlum Island, Seven Mile Island, Wildwoods Island, Cape May Island, Assateague Island, Chincoteague Island, Outer Banks, Sea Islands, Hilton Head Island, Key West (part of Florida Keys)

South Atlantic Ocean
Ascension Island (United Kingdom)
Saint Helena (United Kingdom)
Tristan da Cunha (United Kingdom)
Gough Island (United Kingdom)
Inaccessible Island (United Kingdom)
Nightingale Island (United Kingdom)
Trindade and Martim Vaz (Brazil)
Saint Peter and Saint Paul Archipelago (Brazil)
Rocas Atoll (Brazil)
Fernando de Noronha (Brazil)
Isla de Lobos (Uruguay)
Isla Bermejo (Argentina)

Antarctic region
Bouvet Island (Norway)
Falkland Islands (United Kingdom)
East Falkland
West Falkland
Barren Island, Beauchene Island, Beaver Island, Bleaker Island, Carcass Island, George Island, Jason Islands, Keppel Island, Lively Island, New Island, Pebble Island, Saunders Island, Sealion Island, Speedwell Island, Staats Island, Weddell Island, West Point Island
South Georgia and the South Sandwich Islands (United Kingdom)
Tierra del Fuego (Argentina and Chile)
Isla de los Estados (Argentina)
Isla Observatorio (Argentina)
Gable Island (Argentina)

In gulfs and seas

Within the Caribbean Sea:
San Andrés, Providencia and Santa Catalina (Colombia)
List of islands in the Caribbean
Within the Gulf of Guinea:
Guinea Ecuatorial
List of islands of Equatorial Guinea
Bioko, Annobón, Corisco, Elobey Grande, Elobey Chico
Within the Greenland Sea:
Jan Mayen
Within the Norwegian Sea:
 Lofoten, Norway
Within the Gulf of St. Lawrence:
Anticosti (Canada)
Cape Breton Island (Canada) 
Magdalen Islands (Canada)
Prince Edward Island (Canada)
Saint Pierre and Miquelon (France)
Saint Pierre Island, Miquelon Island, Ile aux Marins, Grand Colombier

Others:
List of islands in the Baltic Sea
List of islands of the British Isles
List of islands in the Mediterranean

See also 
Lists of islands (by ocean, continent, etc.)

References 

Atlantic Ocean
 
Islands